The 1962 St. Louis Cardinals season was the team's 43rd year with the National Football League (NFL) and the third season in St. Louis.

Offseason

Head coach
Wally Lemm, the head coach of the Houston Oilers, champions of the American Football League (AFL), was hired on February 22 and led the Cardinals for four years.

Hall of Fame Game 
The Cardinals tied the New York Giants in the inaugural edition of the Hall of Fame Game in Canton, Ohio, held on Saturday, August 11, following the morning groundbreaking for the Pro Football Hall of Fame.
 New York Giants 21, St. Louis Cardinals 21

Regular season

Schedule

Standings

Awards and records

Franchise records
 Sonny Randle, most pass receptions in one game (16) 
 Sonny Randle, most receiving yards in one game (256) 
 John David Crow, most touchdowns in one season (17)

Milestones 
 Sonny Randle, 256 yards receiving on November 14

References

External links 
 1962 St. Louis Cardinals at Pro-Football-Reference.com

St. Louis
Arizona Cardinals seasons